is a 2014 Japanese jidaigeki comedy film directed by Katsuhide Motoki and starring Kuranosuke Sasaki, Kyoko Fukada and Tsuyoshi Ihara. It was released  on 21 June 2014.

It featured in the Japanese Film Festival in Australia in 2014 under the name Samurai Hustle. The film made its Los Angeles premiere at LA Eigafest 2014.

It was followed by 2016's Samurai Hustle Returns.

Cast
Kuranosuke Sasaki
Kyoko Fukada
Tsuyoshi Ihara
Yasufumi Terawaki
Yusuke Kamiji
Yuri Chinen
Seiji Rokkaku as Imamura
Tokio Emoto

Reception
The film initially grossed ¥900 million in Japan. Its final box office tally was ¥1.55 billion yen.

References

External links
 

2014 comedy films
Japanese comedy films
Jidaigeki films
Films directed by Katsuhide Motoki
2010s Japanese films
2010s Japanese-language films